Dizzy Heights, released in February 2014, is the third solo album by New Zealand singer-songwriter, Neil Finn.

Overview
Dizzy Heights is the third solo studio album from Finn, following the 1998 release Try Whistling This and 2001 release One Nil (released as One All in the USA). This release follows a period in which Finn worked on other projects, including Crowded House and Pajama Club.  The album debuted at #130 on The Billboard Top 200.

The album was recorded between Finn's Roundhead Studios and producer Dave Fridmann's Tarbox Studios in upstate New York, United States (US) in 2013. Musicians on the album include Finn's wife Sharon, his sons Liam and Elroy, and Sean Donnelly (SJD).

Track listing
All songs were written by Neil Finn, except where noted.

"Impressions" – 4:36
"Dizzy Heights" – 3:07
"Flying In the Face of Love" (Neil Finn, Sharon Finn, Sean Donnelly) – 4:04
"Divebomber" – 4:52
"Better Than TV" – 3:34
"Pony Ride" (Neil Finn, Sharon Finn, Sean Donnelly) – 4:45
"White Lies and Alibis" – 5:49
"Recluse" – 5:27
"Strangest Friends" – 3:18
"In My Blood" (Neil Finn, Liam Finn, Elroy Finn, Connan Mockasin) - 3:50
"Lights of New York" – 3:33

Bonus tracks
"Your Next Move" (iTunes Download Bonus Track) – 3:00
"Animal vs Human" (CD Bonus Track) (Neil Finn, Sharon Finn, Sean Donnelly)

Personnel

 Neil Finn - Guitar, Lead Vocals, Clarinet, Drums, Keyboards, Synthesiser, Vibraphone, Producer
 Liam Finn - Guitar, Percussion, Backing Vocals, Producer
 Sharon Finn - Bass, Backing Vocals
 Elroy Finn - Drums, Backing Vocals
 Victoria Kelly - String Arrangements
 Glenn Kotche - Body Percussion
 Ashley Brown - Cello
 Matt Chamberlain - Drums
 Sean Donnelly - Electronic Drums,, Backing Vocals
 Dave Fridmann - Engineer, Producer
 Greg Calbi - Mastering
 Will Ricketts - Percussion 
 Aarahdna - Backing Vocals
 Madeleine Sami - Backing Vocals
 Mary Fridmann - Backing Vocals
 Benjamin Knapp - Whistling

Charts

References

Neil Finn albums
2014 albums
Albums produced by Dave Fridmann
Albums recorded at Tarbox Road Studios
Albums recorded at Roundhead Studios